Heaven or Las Vegas is the sixth studio album by Scottish alternative rock band Cocteau Twins, released on 17 September 1990 by 4AD. Despite 4AD president Ivo Watts-Russell proclaiming it one of the best-ever releases on his label, he released the group from their contract at the end of 1990 because his relationship with the band had soured.

Heaven or Las Vegas peaked at number seven on the UK Albums Chart and number 99 on the US Billboard 200, becoming the band's most commercially successful release. It eventually sold 235,000 copies by 1996, according to Billboard. The album was included in the book 1001 Albums You Must Hear Before You Die, and was voted number 218 in the third edition of Colin Larkin's All Time Top 1000 Albums. In 2020, Rolling Stone listed it at No. 245 in its list of the 500 Greatest Albums of All Time.

The album was voted 18th of Scotland’s 100 Best Rock and Pop Albums in 2003 and was the focus of a BBC Scotland programme, Classic Scottish Albums in 2007.

Background and development
Cocteau Twins released their fifth album, Blue Bell Knoll, in 1988. Despite signing a major label deal with Capitol Records, the band declined to promote it extensively but nevertheless shot a video for "Carolyn's Fingers" which was issued as a single only in the US. The album was not supported by a tour. The band brought on a manager for the first time as they had run into tax trouble previously. Watts-Russell, 4AD president at the time, reportedly "didn't care" for the new manager and his relationship with the band began to sour.

The band took on new familial responsibilities as bassist Simon Raymonde married his first wife, Karen, and vocalist Elizabeth Fraser was expecting her first child with guitarist and co-founder Robin Guthrie. The latter's cocaine habit previously "escalated" during the recording process for Blue Bell Knoll; Fraser and Raymonde believed that the new baby would prove a diversion from Guthrie's dependency and allow the pair to "play [as] happy families." Their wishes did not pan out, with Guthrie relying heavily on drugs as the band developed Heaven or Las Vegas, causing him to experience "deep" paranoia and mood swings. His relationship with Fraser grew increasingly strained as a result.

In September 1989, Fraser and Guthrie's child, Lucy Belle was born; Heaven or Las Vegas was released on her first birthday. Of her pregnancy, Fraser said that she gained clarity about what mattered to her most: "Suddenly I had confidence which I'd never ever had in my life, which I consequently lost after I had the baby, because it's such a frightening experience you lose it again and you have to start over again. But it does change you." Raymonde's father, Ivor Raymonde, died shortly after Lucy Belle's birth, as the band were in the middle of recording. He recounted: "I was only 27, I was still quite young and he was a very influential guy for me so that was a big blow but, looking back on it, having a major life event happening probably helped the record have that edge to it."

Recording and composition 
Heaven or Las Vegas displays musical evolution, with the music becoming more accessible. Fraser's lyrics were more intelligible; many concerned her newborn child Lucy Belle, particularly "Pitch the Baby", which is about her experience in giving birth and welcoming a child. Despite most of Fraser's lyrics "[emerging] in alien tongues", which she sums up as "laziness" and "bad diction", she attributed the album's more identifiable words to Lucy Belle's influence.There was salvation in [Fraser's vocals and lyrics] too, in terms of helping save her relationship with [Guthrie], the joy of bringing a baby into the world that they could love. It did give them a new lease of life, and it gave the album an energy and vibrancy. It was very easy to make the music.Raymonde wrote "Frou-Frou Foxes in Midsummer Fires" the day after his father's death, and Heaven or Las Vegas straddled the two themes: "writing songs about birth, and also death, gave the record a darker side that I hear in songs like 'Cherry-Coloured Funk' and 'Fotzepolitic'". Despite being in a "very good space musically" and describing the recording process as an "inspirational time", Raymonde said: "It was trying to mask all the other shit that was going on that we didn't want to stop and think about for too long". In a retrospective of 4AD by music journalist Martin Aston, he noted that Fraser named the album Heaven or Las Vegas as "a suggestion of truth versus artifice, of music versus commerce, or perhaps a gamble, one last throw of the dice".

The album's drum programming was done by Guthrie, the first step in every Cocteau Twins recording session. Guthrie and Raymonde constructed the music before Fraser recorded her vocals. Raymonde likened Guthrie's rhythms on the album to hip hop beats–despite their music being far removed from it, he acknowledged that it came from a "dance-y" place. Much of Heaven or Las Vegas' "mysterious" instrumental effects were achieved by accident, with guitars as opposed to "omnipresent" synthesizers. As a result of Guthrie's decreased time in the studio, Raymonde's playing was more prominent and he became more involved in the recording process. Raymonde recounted that he would record Fraser's vocals alone for days at a time, during which he first "fully appreciated how amazing she was": "She'd come into the control room and say, 'What was that like?' and I'd scrape the tears away and say, 'That was alright, Liz'. She didn't get off on praise. If I said. 'That was fucking amazing', she'd say 'I thought it was shit.' I learnt not to be too effusive, which was difficult because I was so blown away with what I was hearing."

"We've had it in the back of our mind that we wanted to play live again", said Guthrie at the time of the album's release, "so we thought we'd make some of the pieces more like songs we could actually play live [...] We like it better than all our last records. That's why we continue to make more–because if we made the perfect record we'd sit back and say, 'We can't do any better than that'. We think all our other ones are fucking crap. I'm slightly proud of a couple of tracks on a couple of them, but essentially I'm really embarrassed about what we've done in the past".

Artwork and release
The band wanted a visual representation that would capture "the ethereal", according to Guthrie. Paul West, of the design studio Form, previously worked with Cocteau Twins on the cover for Blue Bell Knoll. West recruited photographer Andy Rumball, and the pair experimented with various materials to generate a "textural and otherworldly" effect. The final artwork is a long exposure of Christmas tree lights against a color backdrop, with its typography produced by hand on an acetate overlay. Much of the original artwork was later destroyed in a flood.

Heaven or Las Vegas was released on 17 September 1990 by 4AD in the United Kingdom, and in conjunction with Capitol Records in the United States. 4AD later reacquired American distribution rights for much of its back catalogue, resulting in a 2003 reissue solely on 4AD, which was remastered by Guthrie. A vinyl edition of the reissue was released in July 2014, which was repressed on 180g in 2020, remastered from high definition audio files.

The album was voted "Album of the Week" by German radio broadcaster Südwestrundfunk, and in France by radio broadcasters RMC and Radio Nantes.

Critical reception and legacy

The album has received critical acclaim. "Heaven or Las Vegas is their finest hour yet," enthused Martin Aston in Q. "Ten exquisite moments that make Kate Bush – their only possible comparison – sound as airborne as Motörhead". The album subsequently featured in the magazine's "best of the year" roundup: "It's wonderfully comforting how the Cocteaus continue on their inimitable course, blissfully regardless of what's going on in the world outside their surreal reality".

"You may be able to dig out some of the words," wrote Andrew Perry in Select, "you may even get to hear some of the songs live, but Heaven or Las Vegas is Cocteau Twins in their usual, spectacular and enigmatic context". "In times when every other pop group is dragging on board whatever chemicals, '60s techniques and hypno-rhythms they can grab in order to achieve the desirable blissed-out condition," said Roger Morton in Vox, "it's a good joke that the Cocteaus can get there with such apparent effortlessness".

Heaven or Las Vegas was listed as the 90th best album of the 1990s by Pitchfork, who complimented Fraser's more direct vocals and the album's complex songwriting. It was also included in the 2008 edition of 1001 Albums You Must Hear Before You Die, and in The Guardians online edition of a similar list. It was considered the band's strongest work since Treasure by AllMusic reviewer Ned Raggett, who called it "simply fantastic" and successful in creating "more accessibility".

NME named Heaven or Las Vegas the 28th best album of 1990. Retrospectively, The Observer listed the album as the 97th-greatest British album ever made. In 2017, NPR listed Heaven or Las Vegas 138th of the 150 Greatest Albums Made By Women. In 2018, Pitchfork ranked it first on its list of the 30 best dream pop albums.

In 2020, Rolling Stone listed it 245th on its list of the 500 Greatest Albums of All Time.

R&B singer The Weeknd named a song "Heaven or Las Vegas" on his mixtape Thursday, and sampled "Cherry-Coloured Funk" for his song "The Knowing" from House of Balloons (2011).

Track listingNotes'
 On the 2014 remastered edition, "Fifty-Fifty Clown" is 3:17 in length and "Frou-Frou Foxes in Midsummer Fires" is 5:48 in length.

Personnel
Elizabeth Fraser – vocals
Robin Guthrie – guitar
Simon Raymonde – bass guitar
Andy Rumball – photography
Paul West – sleeve design

Charts

References

External links
Heaven or Las Vegas at the Eyesore Database

Cocteau Twins albums
1990 albums
4AD albums